Vvedensky Municipal Okrug, formerly Municipal Okrug #58, is a municipal okrug of Petrogradsky District of the federal city of St. Petersburg, Russia. Population:  

The okrug borders Bolshoy Avenue in the north, Vvdenskaya Street in the east, Kronverksky Avenu in the southeast, and Malaya Neva in the southwest.

References

Petrogradsky District